Lascoria orneodalis is a species of litter moth in the family Erebidae. It is found in tropical and subtropical America.

The larvae feed on species of Lycopersicon.

External links
Moths of Jamaica

Herminiinae
Moths described in 1854